"Foggy Mountain Breakdown" is a bluegrass instrumental, in the common "breakdown" format, written by Earl Scruggs and first recorded on December 11, 1949, by the bluegrass artists Flatt & Scruggs and the Foggy Mountain Boys. It is a standard in the bluegrass repertoire. The 1949 recording features Scruggs playing a five-string banjo.

It is used as background music in the 1967 motion picture Bonnie and Clyde, especially in the car chase scenes, and has been used in a similar manner in many other films and television programs, particularly when depicting a pursuit scene in a rural setting. In 1968, both the 1949 Mercury Records version and a newly recorded Columbia Records version were listed at one position of the Billboard Hot 100, peaking at no. 55.

In 2002, Scruggs won a Grammy award for a 2001 performance which featured Steve Martin on second banjo, Albert Lee, Vince Gill, and Randy Scruggs on guitars, Marty Stuart on mandolin, Jerry Douglas on dobro, Leon Russell on organ, Gary Scruggs on harmonica, and Paul Shaffer on piano, among others.

In 2004, it was one of 50 recordings chosen that year by the Library of Congress to be added to the National Recording Registry.

Because of its ubiquity and its status as a favorite tune at bluegrass jams and concerts, guitar and mandolin players commonly learn solo breaks to this song that closely mirror the original banjo version.
The instrumental is related to Bill Monroe's "Bluegrass Breakdown" which Scruggs helped write. It featured the same opening double hammer-on, but "Bluegrass Breakdown" goes to an F major chord whereas Foggy Mountain Breakdown goes to the G major chord's relative minor, an E minor chord.

Chart performance

Various recordings
Glen Campbell recorded the song on his 1981 album Glen Campbell Live.
The Cuban Boys engineered an electronica-inspired version of the song for their early EP Blueprint for Modernisation (appearing again in their Art Vs. Commerce - The Singles Collection).

References

External links
  Tablature for Foggy Mountain Breakdown banjo lead part

United States National Recording Registry recordings
1949 songs
1967 singles
Grammy Hall of Fame Award recipients
Bluegrass songs
Flatt and Scruggs songs
Glen Campbell songs